An incomplete series of events and deaths which occurred in Italy or to Italians in 1298:

Events
 Battle of Curzola

Deaths
 Jacobus de Voragine
 Guido I da Montefeltro
 John of Procida
 John of Genoa
 Aimery IV of Narbonne

References

Italy
Italy
Years of the 13th century in Italy